The Amik Valley is located in the Hatay Province, close to the city of Antakya (Antioch on the Orontes River) in the southern part of Turkey. Along with Dabiq in northwestern Syria, it is believed to be one of two possible sites of the battle of Armageddon according to Islamic eschatology.

Archaeological significance
It is notable for a series of archaeological sites in the "plain of Antioch". The primary sites of the series are Tell al-Judaidah, Çatalhöyük (not to be confused with Çatalhöyük in Anatolia), Tell Tayinat, Tell Kurdu, Alalakh, and Tell Dhahab. Tell Judaidah was surveyed by Robert Braidwood and excavated by C. MacEwan of the Oriental Institute of the University of Chicago in the 1930s.

Lake Amik was an ancient lake in the area, that was located in the centre of Amik Plain.

There is also archaeological evidence for Caspian tigers in this valley (Ellerman and Morrison-Scott, 1951; Vallino and Guazzo Albergoni, 1978).

Islamic eschatology
In a hadith, Abu Hurayrah (a companion of the Islamic Nabi (Prophet) Muhammad) reported that Muhammad said:

Islamic scholars and hadith commentators suggest that the word "Romans" refers to Christians. The hadith further relates the subsequent Muslim victory, followed by the peaceful takeover of Constantinople with invocations of takbir and tasbih, and finally the defeat of the Anti-Christ following the return and descent of Jesus Christ. Other hadiths relate the appearance of Imam Mahdi immediately before the Second Coming of Jesus.

References

External links

 Oriental Institute, Chicago: Amuq survey and related projects
 Palestine Exploration Fund: The Amuq valley

Geography of Hatay Province
Archaeological sites in Hatay Province
Neolithic settlements
Landforms of Hatay Province
Valleys of Turkey